Line 4A (ខ្សែទី៤A) is a route of the Phnom Penh City Bus network in Phnom Penh, Cambodia. It runs northeast to southwest.

The line is represented in the official Phnom Penh City Bus map by Lavender.

Stations

History 

This line used to be represented by the color Purple but switched to Lavender when Line 09 was added in January 2018.

See also 

 Phnom Penh City Bus
 Transport in Phnom Penh
 Phnom Penh

References

External links 

Phnom Penh Bus Rapid Transit